Tom Linder (born July 21, 1985) is a Swedish former professional ice hockey defenceman.

Playing career
Linder played in the Swedish Hockey League for Växjö Lakers, Leksands IF and Karlskrona HK.

References

External links
 

1985 births
Living people
Karlskrona HK players
Leksands IF players
Olofströms IK players
IK Oskarshamn players
Tingsryds AIF players
Swedish ice hockey defencemen
Växjö Lakers players